The 23rd Armoured Brigade "3rd Cavalry Regiment Dorylaeum" 23η Τεθωρακισμένη Ταξιαρχία "3ο Σύνταγμα Ιππικού Δορυλαίον" is a tank brigade of the Hellenic Army.

Structure 
23rd Armoured Brigade in Alexandroupoli
 HQ Company (ΙΣΤ)
 21st Armoured Battalion (21 ΕΜΑ)
 24th Armoured Battalion (24 ΕΜΑ)
 644 Mechanized Infantry Battalion (644 M/K ΤΠ)
 138 Self Propelled Artillery Battalion (138 Α/Κ ΜΜΠ)
 23rd Engineer Company (23 ΛΜΧ)
 23rd Signal Company (23 ΛΔΒ)
 23rd Support Battalion (23 ΕΥΠ)

References

Armoured brigades of Greece
Alexandroupolis